Baja Brewing Company is a craft brewery located in San Jose del Cabo, Baja California Sur, Mexico.

History
Baja Brewing Company was founded by Jordan Gardenhire and his father Charlie Gardenhire in 2007. The father-son duo moved to Los Cabos, Mexico from Colorado and opened the Baja Brewery in the town of San Jose del Cabo. Baja Brewing Company was established as the first brewery in the state of BCS. A third partner Robert Kelly became involved to open and manage the three Baja Brewing Company restaurants located in San Jose del Cabo and Cabo San Lucas.

In December 2014 the company organized "the first craft beer festival in Cabo, bringing in 10 breweries from throughout Mexico."

Brands

The company produces 8 styles of draft beer and 6 styles of bottled beer that are sold throughout Mexico. Draft brands available for regional consumption include Baja Blond, Baja Razz, Escorpion Negro (black scorpion), Peliroja Red (Redhead Red), Peyote Pale Ale, Baja Oatmeal Stout, Cactus Wheat and Mango Wheat.

The Brewery bottles six styles of beer: Baja Blond; a cream ale with 5.5% alc. by vol., Baja Black; black ale with 5.5% alc. by vol., Baja Razz; fruit beer with natural raspberry juice, 5.5% alc. by vol., Baja Red; amber ale with 5.8% alc. by vol. and Baja Stout; Oatmeal Stout beer with 5.8% alc. by vol. and the flagship beer Cabotella Ale, a Mexican blond ale with 5.5% alc. by vol. Cabotella and is distributed in the United States as well as Mexico.

Awards
 Cabotella – Gold Medal – Artisan Awards 2014
 Cabotella – Silver Medal – Copa Cervezas de America 2014
 Baja Black – Silver Medal – cerveza mexico 2014
 Baja Red – Silver Medal – cerveza mexico 2014
 Baja Red – Bronze Medal – Copa Cervezas de America 2014
 Baja Razz – Bronze Medal – Copa Cervezas de America 2014

References

External links
 

Companies based in Baja California Sur
Beer in Mexico
Mexican brands